Sonia Lorena Arriaga García is a Mexican biological engineer specializing in the bioremediation of hydrocarbon-based pollution, and in techniques for removing bioaerosols from indoor environments. She is a professor and researcher at the Instituto Potosino de Investigación Científica y Tecnológica (IPICyT), in San Luis Potosí, Mexico.

Education and career
Arriaga is originally from Ciudad Mante. After earning a bachelor's degree in chemical engineering at the Universidad Autónoma de San Luis Potosí, and beginning a master's program in the same subject there, she became interested in bioprocessing. After completing her master's degree in 2001, she moved to UAM Iztapalapa, where she completed a PhD in 2005, including a research visit to Lund University in Sweden.

She became a postdoctoral researcher in the division of environmental sciences at IPICyT in 2005, and joined IPICyT as a professor and researcher in 2006.

Recognition
Arriaga is a member of the Mexican Academy of Sciences.

In 2022, she was promoted to level 3 of the Sistema Nacional de Investigadores, its highest rank.

References

External links

Mujeres en la Ciencia: Doctora Sonia Arriaga García (52-minute audio interview, Radioteca)

Year of birth missing (living people)
Living people
Mexican engineers
Mexican women engineers
Bioengineers
Women bioengineers
Members of the Mexican Academy of Sciences